Melanoleuca abutyracea is a species of fungus in the family Pluteaceae. Found in Australia, it was first described scientifically in 1931 by John Burton Cleland as a species of Collybia. Mycologist Cheryl Grgurinovic transferred it to Melanoleuca in 2002.

References

External links

Pluteaceae
Fungi of Australia
Fungi described in 1931
Taxa named by John Burton Cleland